This article presents a list of the viceroys of New France in chronological table form.

Jean-François Roberval was appointed in 1540 by Francis I his lieutenant and governor for his lands in Canada. A number of authors cited in his bibliography named him first viceroy of Canada.

References and notes

Annex

Bibliography 
 Joseph Desjardins, Guide parlementaire historique de la Province de Québec. 1792 à 1902, Québec, 1902, 434 p. (en ligne)

Related articles 
 Governor of New France

New France
People of New France
New France
Heads of state of Canada
History of New France
17th century in New France
18th century in New France
18th-century Canadian civil servants

North American monarchs
Titles of nobility in the Americas
17th-century monarchs in North America
18th-century monarchs in North America
1605 establishments in New France
1763 disestablishments in New France